The 2013 Kazakhstan Hockey Cup was the 11th edition of the Kazakhstan Hockey Cup, the national ice hockey cup competition in Kazakhstan. Tent teams participated and Arlan Kokshetau won its 2nd cup.

First round

Group A

Group B

Final round
Match for 3rd place:
Arystan Temirtau - HC Almaty 5-2
Final:
Yertis Pavlodar - Arlan Kokshetau 2-3 (OT)

References

2013–14 in Kazakhstani ice hockey
Kazakhstan Hockey Cup